Nabila Tizi-Sadki (born 20 March 1984) is an Algerian team handball player. She plays for the club Brest Bretagne Handball, and on the Algerian national team. She competed at the 2013 World Women's Handball Championship in Serbia, where Algeria placed 22nd, and Tizi was top scorer for the Algerian team.

References

1984 births
Living people
People from Akbou
Algerian female handball players
21st-century Algerian people